Pay-per-view (PPV) is a type of pay television or webcast service that enables a viewer to pay to watch individual events via private telecast.

Events can be purchased through a multichannel television platform using their electronic program guide, an automated telephone system, or through a live customer service representative. There has been an increasing number of pay-per-views distributed via streaming video online, either alongside or in lieu of carriage through television providers. In 2012, the popular video sharing platform YouTube began to allow partners to host live PPV events on the platform.

Events distributed through PPV typically include boxing, mixed martial arts, professional wrestling, and concerts. In the past, PPV was often used to distribute telecasts of feature films, as well as adult content such as pornographic films, but the growth of digital cable and streaming media caused these uses to be subsumed by video on demand systems (which allow viewers to purchase and view pre-recorded content at any time) instead, leaving PPV to focus primarily on live event programs and combat sports.

History
The earliest form of pay-per-view was closed-circuit television, also known as theatre television, where professional boxing telecasts were broadcast live to a select number of venues, mostly theaters, where viewers paid for tickets to watch the fight live. The first fight with a closed-circuit telecast was Joe Louis vs. Jersey Joe Walcott in 1948. Closed-circuit telecasts peaked in popularity with Muhammad Ali in the 1960s and 1970s, with "The Rumble in the Jungle" fight drawing 50million buys worldwide in 1974, and the "Thrilla in Manila" drawing 100million buys worldwide in 1975. Closed-circuit television was gradually replaced by pay-per-view home television in the 1980s and 1990s.

United States
The Zenith Phonevision system became the first home pay-per-view system to be tested in the United States. Developed in 1951, it used telephone lines to take and receive orders, as well as to descramble a television broadcast signal. The field tests conducted for Phonevision lasted for 90 days and were tested in Chicago, Illinois. The system used IBM punch cards to descramble a signal broadcast during the broadcast station's "off-time". Both systems showed promise, but the Federal Communications Commission denied them the permits to operate.

One of the earliest pay-per-view systems on cable television, the Optical Systems-developed Channel 100, first began service in 1972 in San Diego, California through Mission Cable (which was later acquired by Cox Communications) and TheaterVisioN, which operated out of Sarasota, Florida. These early systems quickly went out of business, as the cable industry adopted satellite technology and as flat-rate pay television services such as Home Box Office (HBO) became popular.

While most pay-per-view services were delivered via cable, there were a few over-the-air pay TV stations that offered pay-per-view broadcasts in addition to regularly scheduled broadcasts of movies and other entertainment. These stations, which operated for a few years in Chicago, Los Angeles and some other cities, broadcast "scrambled" signals that required descrambler devices to convert the signal into standard broadcast format. These services were marketed as ON-TV.

Professional boxing during 1960s1970s
The first home pay-per-view cable television broadcast was the Floyd Patterson vs. Ingemar Johansson rematch in 1960, when 25,000 TelePrompTer subscribers mailed $2 to watch Patterson regain the heavyweight title. The third PattersonJohansson match in 1961 was later viewed by 100,000 paid cable subscribers. Muhammad Ali had several fights on early pay-per-view home television, including Cassius Clay vs. Doug Jones in 1963, and Muhammad Ali vs. Sonny Liston which drew 250,000 buys on cable television in 1964.

Professional boxing was largely introduced to pay-per-view cable television with the "Thrilla in Manila" fight between Muhammad Ali and Joe Frazier in September 1975. The fight sold 500,000 pay-per-view buys on HBO. There was also another major title fight aired on pay-per-view in 1980, when Roberto Durán defeated Sugar Ray Leonard. Cable companies offered the match for $10, and about 155,000 customers paid to watch the fight.

1980s2000s
A major pay-per-view event occurred on September 16, 1981, when Sugar Ray Leonard fought Thomas "Hitman" Hearns for the World Welterweight Championship. Viacom Cablevision in Nashville, Tennessee – the first system to offer the event – saw over 50 percent of its subscriber base purchase the fight. Leonard visited Nashville to promote the fight, and the event proved such a success that Viacom themed its annual report for that year around it. Viacom marketing director Pat Thompson put together the fight, and subsequently put together additional PPV fights, wrestling matches, and even a televised Broadway play.

After leaving Viacom, Thompson became head of Sports View and produced the first pay-per-view football game on October 16, 1983: a college football game between the University of Tennessee and the University of Alabama from Birmingham, Alabama. Sports View played a role in building pay-per-view networks, and became the early pioneer in developing TigerVision for Louisiana State University, TideVision for Alabama and UT Vol Seat for Tennessee. Sports View also produced the Ohio State-Michigan football game for pay-per-view in November 1983.

In 1985, the first pay-per-view cable channels in the United States – Viewer's Choice (now In Demand), Cable Video Store, First Choice and Request TV – began operation within days of each other. Viewer's Choice serviced both home satellite dish and cable customers, while Request TV, though broadcasting to cable viewers, would not become available to satellite subscribers until the 1990s. First Choice PPV was available on Rogers Cablesystems in the United States and Canada. After Paragon Cable acquired the Rogers Cablesystems franchise in San Antonio, Texas, First Choice continued to be carried until Time Warner Cable bought Paragon in 1996. In the United States, pay-per-view broadcasters transmit without advertisements, similar to conventional flat-rate pay television services.

The term "pay-per-view" did not come into general use until the late 1980s  when companies such as Viewer's Choice, HBO and Showtime started using the system to show movies and some of their productions. Viewer's Choice carried movies, concerts and other events, with live sporting events such as WrestleMania being the most predominant programming. Prices ranged from $3.99 to $49.99, while HBO and Showtime, with their event production legs TVKO and SET Pay Per View, would offer championship boxing matches ranging from $14.99 to $54.99.

ESPN later began to broadcast college football and basketball games on pay-per-view through its services ESPN GamePlan and ESPN Full Court, which were eventually sold as full-time out-of-market sports packages. The boxing undercard Latin Fury, shown on June 28, 2003, became ESPN's first boxing card on pay-per-view and also the first pay-per-view boxing card held in Puerto Rico. Pay-per-view has provided a revenue stream for professional wrestling circuits such as WWE, Impact Wrestling, All Elite Wrestling (AEW), World Championship Wrestling (WCW), Ring of Honor (ROH) and Lucha Libre AAA World Wide (AAA).

WWE chairman and chief executive officer Vince McMahon is considered by many as one of the icons of pay-per-view promotion. McMahon owns the domain name payperview.com, which redirects to the WWE Network website.

With the rise of direct broadcast satellite services in the 1990s, this meant more services exclusively for DBS users appeared. DirecTV had Direct Ticket (which, in addition to movies and special events, also included PPV sports packages, most notably NFL Sunday Ticket), while Dish Network had Dish On Demand. PrimeStar, on the other hand, utilized pre-existing services like Viewer's Choice and Request TV (as it was owned by a number of major cable providers), though promotional material bannered all PPV services under the name of PrimeCinema.

HBO PPV (professional boxing)
In 2006, HBO generated 3.7 million pay-per-view buys with $177 million in gross sales. The only year with more buys previously, 1999, had a total of 4 million. The former record fell in 2007 when HBO sold 4.8 million PPV buys with $255 million in sales. BY 2014, HBO had generated 59.3 million buys and $3.1 billion in revenue since its 1991 debut with Evander Holyfield-George Foreman.

1999 differed radically from 2006: 1999 saw four major fight cards: De La Hoya-Trinidad (1.4 million buys), Holyfield-Lewis I (1.2 million), Holyfield-Lewis II (850,000) and De La Hoya-Quartey (570,000). By contrast, only one pay-per-view mega-fight took place in 2006: De La Hoya-Mayorga (925,000 buys). Rahman-Maskaev bombed with under 50,000. The other eight PPV cards that year all fell in the 325,000–450,000 range. Pay-per-view fights in that range almost always generate more money for the promoter and fighters than HBO wants to pay for an HBO World Championship Boxing license-fee.

In May 2007, the junior middleweight boxing match between Oscar De La Hoya vs. Floyd Mayweather Jr. on HBO PPV became the biggest-selling non-heavyweight title fight, with a little more than 2.5 million buyers. The record stood until 2015 before it was broken by Floyd Mayweather Jr. vs. Manny Pacquiao in a fight dubbed as the "Fight of the Century" on May 2, 2015 which generated 4.6 million ppv buys and a revenue of over $400 million.

The leading PPV attraction, Floyd Mayweather Jr. has generated approximately 24 million buys and $1.6 billion in revenue. Manny Pacquiao, ranked second, has generated approximately 20.1 million buys and $1.2 billion in revenue. Oscar De La Hoya, has "sold" approximately 14 million units in total, giving $700 million in domestic television receipts and stands third. In fourth place in buys, Evander Holyfield has achieved 12.6 million units ($550 million); and at fifth, Mike Tyson has reached 12.4 million units ($545 million).

Ross Greenburg, then president of HBO Sports, called the expansion of pay-per-view "the biggest economic issue in boxing", stating "I can't tell you that pay-per-view helps the sport because it doesn't. It hurts the sport because it narrows our audience, but it's a fact of life. Every time we try to make an HBO World Championship Boxing fight, we're up against mythical pay-per-view numbers. HBO doesn't make a lot of money from pay-per-view. There's usually a cap on what we can make. But the promoters and fighters insist on pay-per-view because that's where their greatest profits lie."

"It's a big problem," Greenburg continues. "It's getting harder and harder to put fighters like Manny Pacquiao on HBO World Championship Boxing. If Floyd Mayweather beats Oscar, he might never fight on HBO World Championship Boxing again. But if HBO stopped doing pay-per-view, the promoters would simply do it on their own [like Bob Arum did with Cotto-Malignaggi in June 2006] or find someone else who will do it for them."

Former HBO Sports President Seth Abraham concurs, saying, "I think, if Lou (DiBella) and I were still at HBO, we'd be in the same pickle as far as the exodus of fights to pay-per-view is concerned."

Ultimate Fighting Championship 
The Ultimate Fighting Championship (UFC), a mixed martial arts promotion, was a relative newcomer to the PPV market. However, the promotion experienced a surge in popularity in the mid-2000s, credited initially to the popularity of an associated reality show on the cable channel Spike, The Ultimate Fighter. UFC 52—the first UFC event since its premiere, broke the promotion's record with almost 300,000 buys (in comparison to 250,000 for UFC 5). PPV numbers escalated further in 2006, with its events taking in a gross revenue of $222 million. In October 2016, it was reported that 42% of the UFC's "content revenue" in 2015 came from pay-per-view buys, followed by U.S. and international media rights.

In 2018, UFC 229 would pull an all-time record for the promotion, with estimates indicating that the event attracted nearly 2.4 million buys, breaking the 1.65 million buy record set by UFC 202.

In March 2019, as part of a larger contract with ESPN for media rights in the United States, it was announced that future UFC pay-per-views will only be sold to subscribers of the network's streaming service ESPN+ and in May 2021, which future events are available on Hulu via the add-on.

Professional wrestling
Professional wrestling has a long history of running pay-per-view events. WWE (then WWF) launched its first pay-per-view event in 1985 with its annual flagship event WrestleMania and has run numerous others throughout the years. Although it still offers its events via traditional PPV outlets, they have also been included at no additional charge as part of a larger, subscription-based streaming service known as WWE Network, which as of 2021 is now a part of the NBCUniversal streaming service Peacock in the United States. The service also includes original programming (such as documentary-style series and other wrestling programs) and an on-demand archive of events and television episodes from WWE's library. Following WrestleMania 34, the service had 2.12 million subscribers. Since the beginning of 2022, WWE has ceased using the term "pay-per-view" and replaced it with "Premium Live Events" in promotional materials, to emphasize their carriage via subscription platforms.

Other major organizations such as World Championship Wrestling, Extreme Championship Wrestling, Impact Wrestling, Ring of Honor, and All Elite Wrestling have also run pay-per-view events.

Concerts
In 1999, Woodstock 1999 was broadcast via PPV from Rome, New York for people who wanted to attend but could not. The cameras were a cause of the downfall of the event.

In 2015, PPV broadcasts of the Fare Thee Well: Celebrating 50 Years of the Grateful Dead tour set a record for buys for a music event, with over 400,000.

United Kingdom and Ireland
Viewers in the United Kingdom and Ireland can access pay-per-view via satellite, cable and over-the-internet television services, mainly for films, boxing, mixed martial arts and American professional wrestling via services such as Sky Box Office and BT Sport Box Office. The last couple of years has seen the number of pay-per-view boxing events significantly increase and currently all of the UK's top fights are only available via pay-per-view. Broadcasters (most notably PremPlus) have abandoned their aspirations to introduce PPV into other sports market due to poor interest from the public.

In October 2020 during the 2020-21 season, the Premier League experimented with PPV telecasts of football matches not selected for broadcasts by its main rightsholders (which are usually blacked out 3:00 p.m. kickoffs, amid the COVID-19 pandemic in the United Kingdom, which prevents any attendance of the matches). However, the matches proved unpopular, with team supporters' groups urging fans to make donations to charity instead, and the Premier League announcing that it would allocate the extra matches among its existing rightsholders (BT and Sky, as well as Amazon Prime Video and BBC Sport, with some on free-to-air TV) through at least the end of 2020, as it had done during the conclusion of the previous season.

Canada
In Canada, most specialty television providers provide pay-per-view programming through one or more services. In all cases, prices typically range from around C$4.99 (for movies) up to $50 or more for special events.

Initially, there were three major PPV providers in Canada; Viewers Choice operated in Eastern Canada as a joint venture of Astral Media, Rogers Communications, and TSN. Western International Communications operated a separate service in the west initially known as Home Theatre; it was later rebranded as Viewers Choice under license.

Viewers Choice Canada was a partner in a French-language PPV service known as Canal Indigo, which is now entirely owned by Videotron. Bell Canada launched a PPV service for its ExpressVu television provider known as Vu! in 1999.

Home Theatre was later acquired by Shaw Communications; after gaining permission to operate nationally, it re-branded as a white-label PPV known internally as Shaw PPV in December 2007. In 2014, due to Bell Media's majority ownership of Viewers Choice because of its acquisition of Astral, and because both Bell and Rogers now ran their own in-house PPV operations (Vu! and Sportsnet PPV), Viewers Choice was shut down.

Mainland Europe
In Romania, cable communications operator UPC Romania has notified the National Audiovisual Council (CNA) on the intention to introduce in January, February 2014 at the latest, an on-demand audiovisual media service called Agerpres. According to the manager of UPC Romania-owned Smaranda Radoi UPC, will allow customers to watch movies on demand or live events; as well as broadcasts of performances, concerts and sporting events.

In November 2008, pay-per-view made its debut in Albania through Digitalb on terrestrial and satellite television, with the channel DigiGold.

In France, launched in the late 1990s, Canalsat (Ciné+) and TPS (Multivision) operate their own pay-per-view service. While CanalSat holds the rights to live soccer matches for France's Ligue 1, TPS had the rights for Boxe matches. In 2007, Multivision service ceased by the end of TPS service which merged with Canalsat. Nowadays, Ciné+ is the only existing pay-per-view service in France.

In Croatia, Fight Channel is broadcasting martial arts events organized by the world's most prominent fighting organizations, such as the UFC, K-1, HBO Boxing, Dream, Glory WS, World Series of Boxing etc. and its pay-per-view service covers the Balkans region.

Sky Deutschland, accessible in Germany, Austria and partially in Switzerland, provided nine PPV-Channels called "Sky Select", where their regular Pay-TV customers can see movies or various sports events such as boxing or soccer. As of 1. October 2020 only sport and wrestling events remained on PPV as movies were changed towards a streaming service.

South America

Per nations with Pay-Per-View or PPV system in South América:

In Argentina, Torneos y Competencias is a producer and sports events organization that are broadcasts live main matches of Argentine Soccer in four categories on TyC Sports, TyC Max (six channels), TyC Sports 2, TyC Sports 4 and TyC Sports 5.

In Brazil, in the soccer main matches of Serie A (Six games per matchday) and Serie B (Four games per matchday) in two categories of Brazilian Soccer are broadcast live on Premiere FC and SporTV. The Serie C Championship are broadcast live on SporTV with two games per matchday in Pay TV. In other sports are broadcast live on NBB TV (Exclusive channel of Brazilian Basketball League in Premium system).

In Chile, the exclusive rights of Chilean Soccer are owned by TV Fútbol and broadcast live on a channel called Canal Del Fútbol (The Soccer Channel), also known CDF. Sports Field S.A. has exclusive rights to games on the Chilean professional basketball league, which are broadcast live vía CDO (Premium Signal).

In Paraguay, the Teledeportes producer business have exclusive rights to broadcast live main matches of Paraguayan Soccer in four categories vía Tigo Max and Tigo Sports. Teledeportes have live broadcast of Paraguayan Basketball League broadcast Tuesday at 9:00 pm on Tigo Sports (K.O 21:15) and Wednesday at 8:55 pm on Tigo Max  (K.O 21:10).

In Uruguay, the Tenfield producer business and sports events organization have television exclusive rights for the Uruguayan soccer and basketball club championships, which are broadcast on VTV and VTV Plus.

Australia and the Pacific Islands
Foxtel and Optus Vision introduced pay-per-view direct to home television in Australia in the mid-to-late 1990s. Foxtel had Event TV (until it transformed into its current form; Main Event) while, Optus Vision had Main Attraction Pay-Per-View as its provider. As of 2005, Main Event is the current pay-per-view provider through Foxtel and Optus cable/satellite subscription.

Sky Pacific started a service in Fiji in 2005 and then expanded into American Samoa, Cook Islands, Fiji, Kiribati (East), Nauru, New Caledonia, Niue, Papua New Guinea, Samoa, Solomon Islands, Tonga and Vanuatu, with one, out of their 25 channels, being Pay-Per-View.

Asia
In Malaysia, Astro's Astro Box Office service launched in 2000 in the form of the free-to-air "Astro Showcase".

In Japan, SkyPerfecTV subscribers can receive one-click pay-per-view access to hundreds of channels supplying domestic and international sporting events (including WWE events), movies, and specialty programming, either live or later on continuous repeat on its channel.

In India a pay-per-view service operates; however, pay-per-view sports broadcasts are available. Now also live events like WWE.

List of largest pay-per-view markets

List of pay-per-view bouts

Boxing

Worldwide
The following is a list of boxing fights that have generated over 1million pay-per-view buys worldwide. These figures include closed-circuit theatre television (CCTV), pay-per-view home television (PPV), and pay-per-view online streaming (iPPV).

United States (closed-circuit theatre TV)
Select boxing buy rates at American closed-circuit theatre television venues between 1951 and 2015:

United States (PPV home television)
Select PPV boxing buy-rates between 1960 and 2022:

United Kingdom

Select boxing pay-per-view figures (mainly from Sky Box Office) since 1966. Many of these figures are based on BARB weekly viewing data figures.

Mixed martial arts (MMA)
It sold at least  buys on closed-circuit theatre TV. At a ticket price of $10, the fight grossed at least  (inflation-adjusted ) or more from closed-circuit theatre TV revenue in the United States.

Ultimate Fighting Championship (UFC)
The highest buy rates for the UFC  are as follows.

Note: The UFC does not release official PPV statistics, and the following PPV numbers are as reported by industry insiders.  As of April 2019, all PPV's are iPPV's, with distribution on the internet exclusively via ESPN+.

Professional wrestling (United States)

WrestleMania I in March 1985 sold over 1million buys on closed-circuit theatre TV in the United States, making it the largest pay-per-view showing of a wrestling event in the US at the time.

PPV home television
The highest buy rates for professional wrestling events on pay-per-view home television  are as follows.

List of sportsmen with highest pay-per-view sales
This tables lists the sportsmen who have had the highest pay-per-view sales, with at least 10million buys. It includes sportsmen who have participated in boxing, mixed martial arts, and professional wrestling.

See also

 Bel Air Circuit
 Conditional access
 DAZN
 List of Bellator events
 List of DREAM events
 List of ECW supercards and pay-per-view events
 List of K-1 events
 List of ROH pay-per-view events
 List of Strikeforce events
 List of TNA pay-per-view events
 List of UFC events
 List of WCW pay-per-view events
 List of WWE pay-per-view events

Notes

References

External links
 Capsule history at sports 2/etv/P/htmlP/payperview/payperview.htm Museum of Broadcast Communications 

Television terminology
View
Pay-per-view television